Grégory Sertic (born 5 August 1989) is a French retired professional footballer who played as a defensive midfielder.

Club career

Bordeaux
Born in Brétigny-sur-Orge, Essonne of Croatian descent, Sertic joined FC Girondins de Bordeaux's youth system at the age of 15, from the famed INF Clairefontaine academy. During the 2007–08 season, spent in the Championnat de France Amateur with the senior reserves, he earned praise from first team manager Laurent Blanc.

Sertic made his debut in Ligue 1 on 29 April 2009, starting in a 3–2 away win against Stade Rennais FC. His maiden competitive appearance had taken place on 11 November of the previous year, in the 4–2 home victory over En Avant de Guingamp in the round of 16 of the Coupe de la Ligue where he came on as a late substitute. His first goal in the former competition was scored in only his second appearance, helping the hosts defeat FC Sochaux-Montbéliard 3–0.

For the 2010–11 season, Sertic was loaned to fellow league club RC Lens.

Marseille
On 30 January 2017, Sertic signed a three-and-a-half-year contract with Olympique de Marseille. During his spell at the Stade Vélodrome, he played sparingly due to an anterior cruciate ligament injury.

In February 2019, Sertic moved to FC Zürich of the Swiss Super League until the end of the season. He announced his retirement in November 2020 at the age of 31, and immediately started working as a pundit for Canal+.

International career
On 25 May 2009, Sertic was called up for the first time to the France under-21 side which was due to participate in that year's Toulon Tournament. He made his debut in the competition on 6 June, playing 36 minutes in the 1–0 group stage defeat of Portugal.

Sertic was granted Croatian citizenship in March 2013, as his paternal grandfather was a native of Brinje who moved to the French capital. However, FIFA did not allow him to play for that national team due to new rules about naturalisation of players.

Career statistics

Club

Honours
Bordeaux
Ligue 1: 2008–09
Coupe de France: 2012–13
Coupe de la Ligue: 2008–09
Trophée des Champions: 2009

References

External links

Bordeaux official profile 
Marseille official profile

 
 

1989 births
Living people
People from Brétigny-sur-Orge
French people of Croatian descent
French footballers
Footballers from Essonne
Association football midfielders
France under-21 international footballers
Ligue 1 players
Championnat National 2 players
Championnat National 3 players
Swiss Super League players
ES Viry-Châtillon players
INF Clairefontaine players
FC Girondins de Bordeaux players
RC Lens players
Olympique de Marseille players
FC Zürich players
French expatriate footballers
French expatriate sportspeople in Switzerland
Expatriate footballers in Switzerland